The siege of Yodong Fortress may refer to:

Siege of Yodong Fortress (612), part of the Goguryeo–Sui War
Siege of Yodong Fortress (645), part of the Goguryeo–Tang War